Bruce Douglas Driver (born April 29, 1962) is a Canadian former professional ice hockey defenceman who played 15 seasons in the National Hockey League from 1983–84 until 1997–98.

Early life
When he was 12, Driver played in the 1975 Quebec International Pee-Wee Hockey Tournament with the MTHL's Shopsy's, a youth team affiliated with the Toronto Marlies.

When he was 13, Driver was cut from his bantam team because evaluators thought he was too small. Undeterred, he continued to improve his game, and was later drafted by the Oshawa Generals, a major junior team in the Ontario Hockey League, but decided to play college hockey at the University of Wisconsin instead. In his 3 years with the Badgers, the team won 2 NCAA Championships. Driver was team captain by his second year and an NCAA All-Star.

Before he began his NHL career, Driver also played for Team Canada at the 1984 Winter Olympics in Sarajevo. Team Canada advanced to the medal round, but lost the next two games to the Soviet Union and Sweden, and did not make the podium. Driver was Team Canada's top-scoring defenceman.

Professional career
Driver was drafted in the sixth round (108th overall) by the Colorado Rockies (who became the Devils in 1982) in the 1981 NHL Entry Draft. He spent the first 11 years of his NHL career with the Devils, winning a Stanley Cup with them in 1995. He was signed by the New York Rangers after the 1995 season.

Driver was the Devils team captain during the 1991-92 season; fellow defenseman Scott Stevens took over as captain the following year. From 1987 onwards, he was a regular on his teams' top power play lines. He left the Devils as the all-time leader in assists by a defenseman, with 317, a record later broken by Stevens. Between 1987 and the end of his career, over half of his goals came on the power play.

Personal life
Driver is a resident of Montville, New Jersey. He enjoys playing hockey as a goalie in an adult recreational leagues in New Jersey and coaches a girls' high-school hockey team at Morristown-Beard School that won a state championship in the 2019-20 season. He was also the girls' high-school Hockey Coach of the Year in New Jersey in 2006–07.

Driver is currently a manager at Twin Oaks Ice Rink in Morristown, NJ.

Awards and honors

Career statistics

Regular season and playoffs

International

References

External links

1962 births
Canadian ice hockey defencemen
Colorado Rockies (NHL) draft picks
Ice hockey players at the 1984 Winter Olympics
Living people
Maine Mariners players
New Jersey Devils players
New York Rangers players
Olympic ice hockey players of Canada
Sportspeople from Etobicoke
Ice hockey people from Toronto
Stanley Cup champions
Wisconsin Badgers men's ice hockey players
NCAA men's ice hockey national champions
AHCA Division I men's ice hockey All-Americans